The name is derived from the Greek word Ἑλικώνιος (helikṓnios) meaning Lobster Claws, another word for Heliconias. The second part is from the Latin word Excelsa, sometimes meaning tall, probably meaning "tall Lobster Claw" all together.  Heliconia excelsa is a species of plant in the family Heliconiaceae. It is endemic to Ecuador.  Its natural habitat is subtropical or tropical moist lowland forest.　At its maturity, it can reach a height of 8' to 12' or 15' (2.4 meters to 3.6 or 4.5 meters) in full sun to half shade.

References

Flora of Ecuador
excelsa
Vulnerable plants
Taxonomy articles created by Polbot